The Journal of Clinical Ophthalmology is a peer-reviewed medical journal of ophthalmology. The journal was established in 2007 and is published by Dove Medical Press.

External links 
 

English-language journals
Ophthalmology journals
Publications established in 2007
Open access journals
Dove Medical Press academic journals